Sekhar Barman (born 10 December 1988) is an Indian cricketer. He made his Twenty20 debut for Assam in the 2017–18 Zonal T20 League on 8 January 2018.

References

External links
 

1988 births
Living people
Indian cricketers
Assam cricketers
Place of birth missing (living people)